Happy Time is a 1975 studio album by Roy Eldridge.

Track listing
 "Sweethearts on Parade" (Carmen Lombardo, Charles Newman) – 4:20
 "Willow Weep for Me" (Ann Ronell) – 7:01
 "Makin' Whoopee" (Walter Donaldson, Gus Kahn) – 4:42
 "Gee Baby, Ain't I Good to You" (Andy Razaf, Don Redman) – 3:33
 "All of Me" (Gerald Marks, Seymour Simons) – 4:45
 "I Want a Little Girl" (Murray Mencher, Billy Moll) – 4:10
 "On the Sunny Side of the Street" (Dorothy Fields, Jimmy McHugh) – 6:55
 "I Can't Get Started" (Vernon Duke, Ira Gershwin) – 4:43
 "Call It Stormy Monday (But Tuesday Is Just as Bad)" (T-Bone Walker) – 5:18
 "Let Me Off Uptown" (Earl Bostic, Redd Evans) – 3:04

Personnel

Performance
 Roy Eldridge - trumpet, vocals
 Oscar Peterson – piano
 Joe Pass – guitar
 Ray Brown – double bass
 Eddie Locke – drums

Production
 Phil DeLancie - digital mastering, remastering
 Phil Stern - photography
 Benny Green - liner notes
 Norman Granz - producer

References 

1975 albums
Roy Eldridge albums
Pablo Records albums
Albums produced by Norman Granz